Sonia Shirsat is a Fado singer from Ponda taluka, Goa, India. She has been referred to as "the ambassador of Goan music to the world" and has performed across India and the world and often during cultural and music events in Goa. She sings in 13 different languages Shirsat has been promoting Fado in Goa, by holding training and introductory classes to this form of music at various parts of the region.

Background

In her earlier day job, Shirsat was a lecturer of law. She "bagged an international award for her speaking skills, much before she started singing professionally". She holds an LL.M (Master's in Law) degree. She started singing as a hobby, and has been a professional singer since about 1999. Her mother is Roman Catholic and her father, a Hindu.

Getting into Fado
Shirsat is one of the few from India to excel in the Fado, a music genre which can be traced to the 1820s in Portugal or earlier. She credits Portuguese guitarist Antonio Chainho, who was offering guitar training in Goa some years ago, for introducing her to it. At the end of the workshop conducted by him, there was a search for someone to sing the Fado. Shirsat's voice was found to have "fitted perfectly for the song", and thus began her "tryst with the genre", she says. In five years time, she performed at her first-ever solo concert, in Portugal, 2008.

, she has performed in Goa, Daman, Bangalore, Mumbai, Delhi, Kolkata, Luxembourg, Macau, Kuwait, France, Singapore, Hawaii, Nepal, Canada, London, Dubai, Muscat, Lisbon and Qatar. She has also performed in California, Toronto, Paris, Porto, Oeiras and Seoul.

Shirsat has also performed along with some of the prominent names from the world of Fado, including Katia Guerreiro, Maria Ana Bobone, Raquel Tavares, Rao Kyao, Carlos do Carmo, Argentina Santos, Miguel Capucho, Ricardo Rocha and Antonio Chainho. She has performed on a number of occasions on a number of Portugal-based TV channels, including in live performances on RTPI, Sociedade Independente de Comunicação and Televisão Independente.

In Goa, she is known for her live performances at a number of venues, among these the Art Chamber at Calangute.

Other achievements
Shirsat is the only professional Fadista (Fado singer) in the Indian Subcontinent, a form she has performed since 2003. She also conducts workshops and gives talks on this semi-classical genre of music called the Fado. Apart from the Portuguese Fado, Shirsat is also known for performing Traditional and Pop music from Goa.

Awards
Shirsat has won the 2016 April: Best Singer (Female) Award from the Tiatr Academy of Goa

She has also won the Ustad Bismilla Khan Yuva Puraskar, 2016, in the category of Traditional Music which is conferred by the Sangeet Natak Akademi, Ministry of Culture, Government of India. She attained the Yuva Srujan Puraskar 2011, the highest Award in the Cultural field given by the Govt of Goa in Youth Category.

Media comments
The Hindu newspaper said of her: "Sonia is a prodigious singer with a versatile voice. Rated as the best Fadista in India of all time, the talented singer has toured across the globe."

Discography
 2006: Selected for Fado scholarship in Portugal.
 Saudades de Fado, 2010
 March 2010: Release in Lisbon of  album 'Lisgoa' which Shirsat has performed in with  Antonio Chainho
 Ugddas, 2013.  This collection comprises cover versions of prominent musicians such as Alfred Rose, Chris Perry, Frank Fernand, Wilfy Remembus, among others. Shirsat has also been working on Konkani music in recent times.
 Melodious Goa, 2014
 Saudades de Fado II, 2016
 August 2016: Fado in the City (performance)

References

External links
 

Living people
Indian fado singers
Singers from Goa
Women musicians from Goa
1980 births
21st-century Indian singers
21st-century women musicians